The Lodi Padres were a minor league baseball team based in Lodi, California that played in the California League from 1970 to 1971. They were affiliated with the San Diego Padres and played at Lawrence Park. In 1970, under managers Sonny Ruberto and Ken Bracey, they went 43–97, finishing eighth in the league. In 1971, they went 65-74 under manager George Freese, finishing sixth in the league.

References

Defunct California League teams
Baseball teams established in 1970
Lodi, California
Defunct baseball teams in California
Professional baseball teams in California
Baseball teams disestablished in 1971